Offizierstellvertreter Wilhelm Hippert IC was a World War I flying ace credited with eight confirmed aerial victories.

World War I aerial service
Wilhelm "Willi" Hippert was originally assigned as a two-seater aircraft pilot with Feldflieger Abteilung (Field Flier Detachment) 227. He and his observer were credited with an aerial victory on 17 March 1917, when they shot down a Royal Aircraft Factory FE.2d from No. 20 Squadron RFC over Lomme.

Hippert was transferred to a fighter squadron, Jagdstaffel 39 later in 1917 as a Vizefeldwebel, and thus ended up flying combat over the Battle of Caporetto in northern Italy in a Fokker D.Va he dubbed "Mimmi". On 2 October 1917, he scored his second aerial victory, downing an Italian Savoia Pomilio at 1510 hours. After additional victories on 25 October and 30 November, he became an ace on 8 December 1917. He would tally one more victory with Jasta 39, on 11 January 1918.

On 5 March 1918, Hippert was transferred back to the Western Front. He joined a night fighter squadron, Jagdstaffel 74. In mid 1918, he was promoted to Offizierstellvertreter. By this time, Hippert was flying a Fokker D.VII with a black and white checkerboard pattern on the fuselage, a blue nose, and the name "Mimmi" emblazoned on the top wing. On 7 June 1918, he shot down a Dorand AR2 over Beaumont-sur-Vesle for his seventh victory. On 22 August, he claimed two French bombers, a Caudron R.11 and a Breguet 14, though he was only credited with the former.

At some point during the war, Wilhelm Hippert won the Iron Cross.

Sources of information

References
 Franks, Norman; Bailey, Frank W.; Guest, Russell. Above the Lines: The Aces and Fighter Units of the German Air Service, Naval Air Service and Flanders Marine Corps, 1914–1918. Grub Street, 1993. , .

Recipients of the Iron Cross (1914)
German World War I flying aces
Luftstreitkräfte personnel